The 68th Brigade was a formation of  the British Army. It was raised as part of the new army also known as Kitchener's Army and assigned to the 23rd Division and served on the Western Front during the First World War.

Formation
The infantry battalions did not all serve at once, but all were assigned to the brigade during the war.
10th (Service) Battalion, Northumberland Fusiliers
11th (Service) Battalion, Northumberland Fusiliers 	 
12th (Service) Battalion, Durham Light Infantry 	 
13th (Service) Battalion, Durham Light Infantry 	
68th Machine Gun Company 	
68th Trench Mortar Battery

Commanders

References

Infantry brigades of the British Army in World War I